Marc Gicquel and Sergiy Stakhovsky were the defending champion, but Gicquel decided not to compete this year. Stakhovsky played alongside Lucas Pouille and finished as runners-up.

Thiemo de Bakker and Robin Haase won the title, defeating Stakhovsky and Pouille in the final, 6–3, 7–5.

Seeds

Draw

External Links
 Main Draw

BNP Paribas Primrose Bordeaux - Doubles
2015 Doubles